Thomas Edward George Ward (18 April 1913 – 1997) was an English footballer. A right-half and later a forward, he had a six-year career in the Football League from 1933 to 1939, playing for Crystal Palace, Grimsby Town, Port Vale, Stoke City, and Mansfield Town.

Career
Ward played for Chatham, before he was signed by Crystal Palace in August 1933. He made nine Third Division South appearances for the "Eagles", before he moved on to Grimsby Town in June 1934. The "Mariners" finished fifth in the First Division in 1934–35 and 17th in 1935–36. Ward departed Blundell Park in June 1936 when he signed with Port Vale. He converted to a centre-forward role in November 1936 and with 18 goals in 32 games in the 1936–37 season was the club's top scorer; during the campaign he hit hat-tricks past Chester and Gateshead at The Old Recreation Ground. He bagged four goals in 14 appearances in 1937–38, but was transferred to rivals Stoke City in exchange for Harry Davies and a small fee in February 1938. He continued his scoring record from the Third Division North into the First Division, hitting four goals in five league games for the "Potters", including two in a 3–2 win over Manchester City at the Victoria Ground (Stanley Matthews scoring the third). Despite this, he was returned to the "Valiants" in February 1939. He hit four goals in 12 Third Division South games in 1938–39, but was dropped from the first team in April 1939, and transferred to league rivals Mansfield Town two months later. His career was then ended due to the outbreak of World War II and the subsequent suspension of the Football League.

Career statistics
Source:

References

1913 births
1997 deaths
Sportspeople from Chatham, Kent
Footballers from Kent
English footballers
Association football midfielders
Association football forwards
Chatham Town F.C. players
Crystal Palace F.C. players
Grimsby Town F.C. players
Port Vale F.C. players
Stoke City F.C. players
Mansfield Town F.C. players
English Football League players